Walkerton is a town in Lincoln Township, St. Joseph County, in the U.S. state of Indiana. The population was 2,144 at the 2010 Census. It is part of the South Bend–Mishawaka, IN-MI, Metropolitan Statistical Area.

History
Walkerton was platted in 1856. It was named for John Walker, a railroad promoter. The town was laid out by the railroad surveyors and the first lot was taken by C.W.N. Stephens, Walkerton's first postmaster. Stephens relocated his general store from nearby West York. The Walkerton post office has been in operation since 1860.

During World War II Walkerton housed some of the workers for the nearby Kingsbury Ordnance Plant.  The plant initially sought 10,000 workers, and the entire population of LaPorte numbered only 16,000 in 1940. In August 1941 Kingsbury's first shells were loaded and en route to the front lines.

In July 2006, Walkerton celebrated its sesquicentennial (150-year anniversary).

In April, 2015, Walkerton gained national attention after the owners of the town's local pizza parlor, Memories Pizza, became the first known Indiana business to advertise that it would not cater to a gay wedding after the passing of Indiana's Religious Freedom Restoration Act.

Geography

Demographics

2010 census
As of the census of 2010, there were 2,144 people, 763 households, and 546 families living in the town. The racial makeup of the town was 95.0% White, 0.4% African American, 0.7% Native American, 0.3% Asian, 2.1% from other races, and 1.5% from two or more races. Hispanic or Latino of any race were 5.0% of the population.

There were 763 households, of which 38.9% had children under the age of 18 living with them, 51.1% were married couples living together, 15.7% had a female householder with no husband present, 4.7% had a male householder with no wife present, and 28.4% were non-families. 24.2% of all households were made up of individuals, and 10.7% had someone living alone who was 65 years of age or older. The average household size was 2.70 and the average family size was 3.18.

The median age in the town was 37.2 years. 26.5% of residents were under the age of 18; 8.9% were between the ages of 18 and 24; 24.7% were from 25 to 44; 25.4% were from 45 to 64; and 14.4% were 65 years of age or older. The gender makeup of the town was 46.9% male and 53.1% female.

2000 census
As of the census of 2000, there were 2,274 people, 810 households, and 562 families living in the town. The racial makeup of the town was 94.24% White, 0.48% African American, 0.44% Native American, 0.35% Asian, 3.65% from other races, and 0.84% from two or more races. Hispanic or Latino of any race were 5.85% of the population.

There were 810 households, out of which 37.0% had children under the age of 18 living with them, 49.4% were married couples living together, 14.7% had a female householder with no husband present, and 30.5% were non-families. 26.7% of all households were made up of individuals, and 12.5% had someone living alone who was 65 years of age or older. The average household size was 2.67 and the average family size was 3.23.

In the town, the population was spread out, with 29.2% under the age of 18, 9.1% from 18 to 24, 27.7% from 25 to 44, 18.0% from 45 to 64, and 15.9% who were 65 years of age or older. The median age was 34 years. For every 100 females, there were 90.6 males. For every 100 females age 18 and over, there were 86.0 males.

The median income for a household in the town was $36,481, and the median income for a family was $42,407. Males had a median income of $31,895 versus $24,583 for females. The per capita income for the town was $15,122. About 11.3% of families and 14.5% of the population were below the poverty line, including 19.9% of those under age 18 and 14.4% of those age 65 or over.

Arts and culture
Libraries include Walkerton-Lincoln Township Public Library; Fish Lake Branch library, operated by the La Porte County Public Library; and Koontz Lake Branch library, operated by Starke County Public Library System.

Education
John Glenn School Corporation operates Walkerton Elementary School, Urey Middle School, and John Glenn High School. The district

Notable people
 Chad Blount, NASCAR Nationwide Series driver
 Walter LaFeber (b. 1933), historian of American foreign relations; born in Walkerton
 Harold C. Urey (1893–1981), recipient of 1934 Nobel Prize in Chemistry for discovery of deuterium; born in Walkerton

References

External links

 Town of Walkerton, Indiana website

Towns in St. Joseph County, Indiana
Towns in Indiana
South Bend – Mishawaka metropolitan area
1856 establishments in Indiana
Populated places established in 1856